Bedegkér is a village in Somogy county, Hungary. It was formed in 1939 uniting the two separate villages of Bedeg and Magyarkér.

External links 
 Street map (Hungarian)

References 

Populated places in Somogy County